The QRL Women's Premiership, known as the BMD Premiership due to sponsorship from BMD Group, is the top level of women's rugby league football in Queensland, Australia. Run by the Queensland Rugby League, the competition is Queensland's first statewide open age women's competition.

On 3 March 2021, the QRL announced that the Souths Logan Magpies would not compete in that season's premiership but planned to return in 2022. Valkyries Queensland, a new team made up of players from Souths Logan and other Queensland teams, were named to take their place.

Teams
The QRL Women's Premiership consists of eight teams, five from South East Queensland and one each from North Queensland, Central Queensland and Northern New South Wales. The league operates on a single group system, with no divisions or conferences and no relegation and promotion from other leagues.

Current clubs

Previous clubs

Grand Finals

2021

Player of the Year

See also

 Queensland Rugby League
 Women's rugby league in Australia
 Women's rugby league
 Rugby League Competitions in Australia

References

External links

Queensland Rugby League
Women's rugby league competitions in Australia
Rugby league competitions in Queensland
2020 establishments in Australia
Sports leagues established in 2020
Professional sports leagues in Australia